Bistcho Lake 213 is an Indian reserve of the Dene Tha' First Nation in Alberta, located within Mackenzie County.

References

Indian reserves in Alberta
Dene communities